This is a list of ARY Film Awards ceremonies.  This list is current as of the 1st ARY Film Awards ceremony held on May 25, 2014.

Venues 

 2014: Golf Club, DHA Phase VIII, Karachi, Sindh, Pakistan.

Networks 

 2014: ARY Digital Network or ARY Digital

Ceremonies
All award times local (PST/UTC+5).

Film awards by ceremony

ARY Film Awards 2014

Viewers' choice 

 Best actor: Shaan Shahid (in Waar)
 Best actor in comic role: Ismail Tara (in Main Hoon Shahid Afridi)
 Best actor in negative role: Shamoon Abbasi (in Waar)
 Best actress: Ayesha Khan (in Waar)
 Best director: Bilal Lashari for Waar
 Best female playback singer: Abida Parveen (in Ishq Khuda)
 Best film: Waar (produced by Hassan Rana)
 Best independent film: Josh: Independence Through Unity (directed by Iram Parveen Bilal, produced by Saad Bin Mujeeb and Kelly Thomas)
 Best male playback singer: Rahat Fateh Ali Khan (in Zinda Bhaag)
 Best original music: Main Hoon Shahid Afridi (sung by Shani and Kami)
 Best star debut female: Ayesha Khan (in Waar)
 Best star debut male: Hamza Ali Abbasi (in Main Hoon Shahid Afridi)
 Best supporting actor: Hamza Ali Abbasi (in Waar)
 Best supporting actress: Meesha Shafi (in Waar)

Technical award 

 Best action: Waar
 Best background score: Zinda Bhaag
 Best cinematography: Waar
 Best dialogue: Main Hoon Shahid Afridi 
 Best screenplay: Siyaah..
 Best story: Zinda Bhaag

Honorary Award 

 International icon: Ali Zafar
 Lifetime achievement award: Nadeem Baig
 Special contribution to Pakistani cinema: Shaan Shahid

ARY Film Awards 2016

Jury choice 

 Best actor: Sarmad Sultan Khoosat (in Manto)
 Best actress: Samiya Mumtaz (in Moor)
 Best director: Nadeem Beyg (in Jawani Phir Nahi Ani)
 Best film: Jawani Phir Nahi Ani

ARY Film Awards 2017 

 Best short: In Search of America, Inshallah (directed by Danish Renzu)

ARY Film Awards 2020 

 Best actor: Ahmad Ali Butt
 Best actress: Ramsha Khan (in Ghissi Pitti Mohabbat tv-show)

See also
 Hum Awards

References

External links
 ARY Film Awards Official website

ARY Film Awards
 
Lists of award ceremonies